Koolyanobbing is located  north-northeast of the town of Southern Cross, Western Australia. A subsidiary of Cleveland-Cliffs of Cleveland, Ohio mines Iron ore here. The ore is railed to the port at Esperance for export. Current operations commenced in 1993. The current owner and operator of the lease is Mineral Resources who took over from Cleveland-Cliffs in July 2018. MRL currently mine the ore and transport it to the port of Esperance

History
The first European to visit the area was Charles Cooke Hunt in 1864 who explored the Koolyanobbing range that is situated nearby.

The next European to visit the area, in 1887 and later in 1891, was a gold prospector named Henry Dowd, who thought that the rocks in the area were of no value. He recorded his findings and stored them in a bottle that was buried next to a survey peg and which was found again in 1963 at what is now known as Dowd Hill.

Iron ore was first mined at Koolyanobbing from around 1950. It was sent by truck to Southern Cross from where it was shipped by rail to Wundowie, where there was a state-owned blast furnace.

The town was established to service a new iron ore mine in the 1960s at Dowd Hill. The town was gazetted in 1965. The former Eastern Goldfields Railway between Southern Cross and Kalgoorlie was realigned for change to standard gauge, and to service the Koolyanobbing mine.

The name is of local Aboriginal origin, meaning "place of large rocks."
Dampier Mining Co Ltd, a subsidiary of BHP, mined iron ore between 1967 and 1983. Ore was shipped by rail to Kwinana, near Perth, to supply Australian Iron & Steel's (also a BHP subsidiary ) blast furnace. The closure of the Kwinana blast furnace in 1982 resulted in suspension of iron ore mining at Koolyanobbing until 1993.

WA Salt Supply produces salt at Lake Deborah,  to the north, which is railed from Koolyanobbing to Kwinana.

The Koolyanobbing Range supports many endemic, priority and one declared rare flora species.

Rail services
The Prospector service, which runs each way between East Perth and Kalgoorlie once or twice each day, stops at Koolyanobbing.

See also

References

Mining towns in Western Australia
Eastern Goldfields Railway
Shire of Yilgarn